Cteniloricaria platystoma is a species of armored catfish endemic to Suriname.

References
 

Harttiini
Fish of Suriname
Endemic fauna of Suriname
Taxa named by Albert Günther
Fish described in 1868